Marny Jolly (born 4 February 1948) is a Malaysian former swimmer. She competed in the women's 200 metre breaststroke at the 1964 Summer Olympics. She was the first woman to represent Malaysia at the Olympics.

References

1948 births
Living people
Malaysian female breaststroke swimmers
Olympic swimmers of Malaysia
Swimmers at the 1964 Summer Olympics
Place of birth missing (living people)
20th-century Malaysian women